Manju Pathrose is an Indian actress who appears in Malayalam television and films. She was a contestant along with her husband in the reality TV show Veruthe Alla Bharya (2012) on Mazhavil Manorama. She got her first break with the character role of Syamala in Marimayam (2013-2019), a popular sitcom on Mazhavil Manorama. She won the Kerala State Television Award (Special Jury Award) for her performance as Thankam in the sitcom Aliyan vs Aliyan (2017-2019). She has acted in more than 30 Malayalam films, including Munthirivallikal Thalirkkumbol (2017). She was a participant in the second season of Malayalam reality TV show Bigg Boss (2020).

Early life 
Manju was born to Pathrose and Reetha at Kalluvathikkal, Kollam. She attended Bethlehem Girls High School, Njaralloor, Kizhakkambalam, and Bharata Mata College, Thrikkakara.

Career 

She received her first acting offer in A. K. Lohithadas-directed 2003 film Chakram after the film's casting team saw her photographs of one of her dance show. Manju made her debut appearance on television in the second season of the couples reality TV show Veruthe Alla Bharya on Mazhavil Manorama. The show paved her way to her first acting role in television through a character role in Marimayam, a popular comedy sitcom on Mazhavil Manorama. It was her breakthrough character as an actress. She was also featured in other sitcoms, such as Mayamohini and Kunnamkulathangaadi. She won the Kerala State Television Awards (Special Jury Award) for her performance as Thankam in Aliyan vs Aliyan. In January 2020, she entered as a contestant in the 15 week-long Malayalam reality television show Bigg Boss (Malayalam season 2), which is broadcast in Asianet and hosted by actor Mohanlal.

Personal life
She is married to Sunil Bernard, a percussionist, and has a son, Ed Bernard.

Filmography

Films

Television

Web series

Short films

Awards

References

External links
 
 Manju Sunichen - Film Actress, Serial Actress

Living people
Actresses from Kerala
Indian film actresses
Actresses in Malayalam cinema
Indian television actresses
Actresses in Malayalam television
Bigg Boss Malayalam contestants
1982 births